Lippe  was a department of the First French Empire in present-day Germany. It was named after the river Lippe. It was formed in 1811, when Principality of Salm and a part of the Grand Duchy of Berg was annexed by France. Its territory is now part of the German lands of Lower Saxony and North Rhine-Westphalia. Its capital was Münster.

The department was subdivided into the following arrondissements and cantons (situation in 1812):

 Münster, cantons: Dülmen, Haltern, Münster, Nottuln and Sankt Mauritz. 
 Neuenhaus, cantons: Bad Bentheim, Heede, Neuenhaus, Nordhorn and Wesuwe.
 Rees, cantons: Bocholt, Borken, Emmerich, Rees, Ringenberg and Stadtlohn. 
 Steinfurt, cantons: Ahaus, Billerbeck, Coesfeld, Ochtrup, Rheine and Steinfurt. 

Its population in 1812 was 339,355. 

In the months before the Lippe department was formed, the arrondissements of Rees and Münster were part of Yssel-Supérieur, the arrondissement of Steinfurt was part of Bouches-de-l'Yssel and the arrondissement of Neuenhaus was part of Ems-Occidental. After Napoleon was defeated in 1814, the department was divided between the Kingdom of Hanover and Prussia.

References

Former departments of France in Germany
1811 establishments in the First French Empire